Bulle railway station is a railway station in the municipality of Bulle, in the Swiss canton of Fribourg. It is located at the junction of three railway lines: the Bulle–Romont, Bulle–Broc, and Palézieux–Bulle–Montbovon lines. All three are owned by Transports publics Fribourgeois.

History 
Prior to 2019, the station was located at the southern end of the Place de la Gare. The standard gauge Bulle–Romont railway line terminated at the station, while interchange was possible between the  gauge Bulle–Broc and Palézieux–Bulle–Montbovon lines. A major renovation project, scheduled to be completed in 2023, is building a new station slightly to the north on Rue Rieter. As part of this project the Bulle–Broc will be converted to standard gauge.

Services 
 the following services stop at Bulle:

 RER Fribourg:

References

External links 
 
 

Railway stations in the canton of Fribourg
Transports publics Fribourgeois stations